Neoblasts (ˈniːəʊˌblæst) are non-differentiated cells found in flatworms called  planarians.  Neoblasts make up about 30 percent of all cells in planaria.  Neoblasts give planarians an extraordinary ability to regenerate lost body parts. A planarian split lengthwise or crosswise will regenerate into two separate individuals.

Characteristics 
A neoblast is a non-differentiated cell found in planarians and are responsible for regeneration. Neoblasts have little cytoplasm and a huge nucleus which is a characteristic of pluripotent cells. They are the only dividing and growing cells in planaria.  This mitotic characteristic is how they are detected by adding Bromodeoxyuridine (BrdU) and staining with anti-BrdU.  They have a size between 5 µm to 8 µm in diameter. Neoblasts represent about 30 percent of all cells in planaria. They are not present in the anterior, posterior or pharynx.

Neoblast form blastema capable of growth and regeneration into organs or body parts. Blastemas, in general, are typically found in the early stages of an organism's development such as in embryos, and in the regeneration of tissues, organs and bone.

Blastema formation 

In flatworms, the formation of a blastema needs adult stem cells that are called neoblasts for regeneration to occur.

Right after amputation, a wound response is initiated. All cells in the wound area produce the same transcriptional response regardless of where the wound happened. After this initial wound response, the transcriptional profile changes depending on the location.

A regeneration blastema forms from clonogenic neoblasts (cNeoblast), which work as stem cells to replace older adult cells.

Clonogenic neoblasts also move to a wound site and regenerate the tissue by producing dividing progenitor cells, and finally, all the specific cells.

Transplantation of just one clonogenic neoblast, a worm with no neoblast, restored all the organism's cells. One single neoblast can regenerate an entire irradiated animal that has been rendered incapable of regeneration following transplantation into an irradiated, neoblast-free worm, and this shows that at least some neoblasts are pluripotent.

Some amount of endoderm is needed for blastema formation.

Neoblast specialization 

The gene smed-wi-1 is expressed by all neoblasts.

There are two distinct populations of neoblasts, called zeta and sigma.  Zeta and sigma neoblasts look the same, but they have different gene regulatory networks. Also, zeta neoblasts are postmitotic, while sigma neoblasts are mitotic and specifically responsible for injury repair. Sigma neoblasts produce brain, intestine, muscle, excretory, pharynx, and eye cell types. They also lead to cells that become zeta neoblasts. Zeta neoblasts then develop the other epidermal cell types.

Molecular characteristics

Components of chromatoid bodies 
Neoblasts have chromatoid bodies, which are electronically dense structures composed of ribonucleoprotein complexes that are possibly responsible for maintaining neoblasts. Two protein components have been found within the chromatoid bodies DjCBC-1 and SpolTud-1, which are homologous to proteins involved in the proliferation of germline cells in other organisms.

Piwi and the interaction of small RNAs in neoblasts 
The Argonaut Piwi sub-family of proteins and the small RNAs that interact with them are essential for germline cell development, cell turnover, epigenetic regulation, and repression of transposable elements.  Planarians lacking or are deficient in the expression of piwi show defects in the maintenance and differentiation of cells of the germline.  A class of small non-coding RNAs are strongly expressed in neoblasts which serve as specific regulators for gene expression . These accompanied by the action of piwi would be the key regulators in the maintenance of the neoblasts.

Involved Signaling Pathways 
Several different signaling pathways are involved with limb regeneration through the formation of the blastema. After using RNA interference,  Smad-beta-catenin-1 was found to set up the anterior-posterior axis. Inhibitions to this result in reversed polarity across the blastema.

Transplantation of a single neoblast to a fatally injured animal has been shown to rescue the animal

An analysis of the genome of S. mediterranea indicated the presence of a previously unknown family of long terminal repeats and the lack of several essential genes, including genes responsible for the synthesis of fatty acids and the MAD1 and MAD2 genes, which were thought to be essential components of the spindle assembly checkpoint.

History 
Regeneration research using planarians began in the late 1800s and was popularized by T.H. Morgan at the beginning of the 20th century. Alejandro Sanchez-Alvarado and Philip Newmark transformed planarians into a model genetic organism in the beginning of the 20th century to study the molecular mechanisms underlying regeneration. Morgan found that a piece corresponding to 1/279th of a planarian or a fragment with as few as 10,000 cells could regenerate into a new worm within one to two weeks. Morgan also  found that if both the head and the tail were cut off a flatworm the middle segment would regenerate a head from the former anterior end and a tail from the former posterior end.

Schmidtea mediterranea has emerged as the species of choice for research due to its diploid chromosomes and the existence of both asexual and sexual strains. Recent genetic screens utilizing double-stranded RNA technology have uncovered 240 genes that affect regeneration in S. mediterranea. Many of these genes have orthologs in the human genome.

It used to be thought that old cells dedifferentiated and produced a regeneration blastema of undifferentiated cells to form the new structure using paracrine factors. This was disproved in 2012.

Application 
The study of neoblasts helps uncover the mechanisms and functioning of stem cells and tissue degeneration. Planarians can regenerate any body part from small pieces in a few days and have many adult stem cells.  They are easy to culture and grown to large populations. Their proteins are similar to human proteins. RNA interference is done by feeding, injecting, or soaking them in double-stranded RNA. The genome of Schmidtea mediterranea has been sequenced.  In humans, no known pluripotent stem cells remain after birth.

A collaborative research community on planarian research, EuroPlanNet, was launched in May 2010.

References

Animal developmental biology